Cryptandra minutifolia is a flowering plant in the family Rhamnaceae and is endemic to the south-west of Western Australia. It is a spreading shrub with oblong to elliptic leaves and clusters of white or pink, tube-shaped flowers.

Description
The upper surface of the leaves is minutely pimply, the lower surface mostly concealed, and there is a downcurved point on the tip. The flowers are white or pink with 8 to 14 broadly egg-shaped floral bracts at the base. Flowering mainly occurs from June to September, and the fruit is a schizocarp.

Taxonomy and naming
Cryptandra minutifolia was first formally described in 1995 by Barbara Lynette Rye in the journal Nuytsia from specimens collected near Mount Madden, south-east of Lake King in 1968. The specific epithet (minutifolia ) means "small-leaved", referring to the leaves being smaller than the flowers.

In the same journal, Rye described two subspecies of C. minutifolia, and the names are accepted by the Australian Plant Census:
 Cryptandra minutifolia subsp. brevistyla Rye has fewer, larger flowers, more floral bracts and longer floral tubes, styles and sepals than the autonym.
 Cryptandra minutifolia Rye subsp. minutifolia

Distribution and habitat
This cryptandra usually grows on plains in mallee between Manmanning, Carrabin, Dumbleyung and the Ravensthorpe Range in the Avon Wheatbelt, Coolgardie Esperance Plains and Mallee bioregions of south-western Western Australia. Subspecies minutifolia has a more easterly distribution than subsp. brevistyla.

Conservation status
Both subspecies of C. minutifolia are listed as "not threatened" by the Government of Western Australia Department of Biodiversity, Conservation and Attractions.

References

minutifolia
Rosales of Australia
Flora of Western Australia
Plants described in 1995
Taxa named by Barbara Lynette Rye